Landfill gas migration is a complex process in which gases produced by waste in a landfill move from the site of original deposition to other places via diffusion, usually from areas of high concentration to low. The process is also affected by the permeability of the ground and other factors, such as pressure differences in the soil, cavities, pipes, and tunnels. Changes in atmospheric pressure

and the water table can encourage this migration.

These gases can include methane, carbon dioxide, hydrogen, and volatile organic compounds (there are approximately 500 others that can be present in trace forms) from the waste on site and its degradation over time.

Steps must be taken to prevent this migration from the landfill site as it might enter buildings in the vicinity. This can be done on the site by means of combinations of geomembranes and clay based products, see gas protection.

Gas protection
Gas protection for buildings should consist of an impermeable gas membrane and also a layer where the gas will collect and be vented in a controlled manner.

Guidance for this in the UK can be found in CIRIA C665  and also BS 8485 and Title 40 of the United States Code of Federal Regulations, parts 239 through 282.  This subchapter, I, was initially promulgated in 1976 and is also known as the Resource Conservation and Recovery Act.

See also
Anaerobic digestion
Atmospheric methane
Final cover 
Environment of the United States
Environmental issues in the United States
Landfill gas monitoring
Landfill gas utilization
Waste minimisation

References
CIRCA 665 and BS8485

Landfill